Orthodoxy in Iraq may refer to:

Eastern Orthodoxy in Iraq
Oriental Orthodoxy in Iraq